Fanatik may refer to:

 Fanatik (Turkey), a Turkish newspaper
 , a Romanian newspaper

See also
 Fanatic (disambiguation)